George Huxley ( 1687–1744), of Stoke, Buckinghamshire, was a British politician who sat in the House of Commons from 1722 to 1741.
  
Huxley was the eldest son of Thomas Huxley of Bow, Middlesex, and his wife Arabella Becher, daughter of Sir William Becher of Howbury, Bedfordshire. He was admitted at Clare College, Cambridge on 3 May 1704 and at Middle Temple on 15 May 1704.

Huxley was elected Member of Parliament for Bedford in a contest at the  1722 general election. In 1725 he was appointed a Commissioner of victualling but lost his seat at the by-election on  28 May 1725 following his appointment. The Government brought him in as MP for Newport (Isle of Wight) at a by-election on 1 February 1726 and he voted with the Administration in all recorded divisions. He was re-elected at the 1727 general election. In 1729 he was appointed muster-master general with a salary of £800. He was returned unopposed at the  1734 general election. He did not stand in    1741

Huxley died on 19 July 1744. He had one son.

References

.

1680s births
1744 deaths
Members of Parliament for Newport (Isle of Wight)
British MPs 1722–1727
British MPs 1727–1734
British MPs 1734–1741